General elections were held in the Dominican Republic in 1908. Ramón Cáceres was elected president by an electoral college.

Results

President

References

Dominican
1908 in the Dominican Republic
Presidential elections in the Dominican Republic
Elections in the Dominican Republic